The London–Sydney Marathon was a car rally from the United Kingdom to Australia. It was first run in 1968, a second event by the same organizers was run in 1977 and a third in 1993 to commemorate the 25th anniversary of the original. Three further rallies have subsequently been contested in 2000, 2004 and 2014.

The 1968 event inspired different organizers to create the 1970 London to Mexico World Cup Rally, the 1974 London-Sahara-Munich World Cup Rally, and the Dakar Rally.

The original 1968 event was won by Andrew Cowan, Colin Malkin and Brian Coyle, driving a Hillman Hunter. Fifty-six cars finished.

1968

Background
The original Marathon was the result of a lunch in late 1967, during a period of despondency in Britain caused by the devaluation of the pound. Sir Max Aitken, proprietor of the Daily Express and two of his editorial executives, Jocelyn Stevens and Tommy Sopwith, decided to create an event which their newspaper could sponsor, and which would serve to raise the country's spirits. Such an event would, it was felt, act as a showcase for British engineering and would boost export sales in the countries through which it passed.

The initial UK£10,000 winner's prize offered by the Daily Express was soon joined by a £3,000 runners-up award and two £2,000 prizes for the third-placed team and for the highest-placed Australians, all of which were underwritten by the Daily Telegraph newspaper and its proprietor Sir Frank Packer, who was eager to promote the Antipodean leg of the rally.

The route
An eight-man organising committee was established to create a suitably challenging but navigable route.

The remaining crews departed Bombay at 03:00 on Thursday 5 December, arriving in Fremantle at 10:00 on Friday 13 December before they restarted in Perth the following evening. Any repairs attempted on the car during the voyage would lead to the crew's exclusion.

Result

Roger Clark established an early lead through the first genuinely treacherous leg, from Sivas to Erzincan in Turkey, averaging almost  in his Lotus Cortina for the  stage. Despite losing time in Pakistan and India, he maintained his lead to the end of the Asian section in Bombay, with Simo Lampinen's Ford Taunus second and Lucien Bianchi's DS21 in third.

However, once into Australia, Clark suffered several setbacks. A piston failure dropped him to third, and would have cost him a finish had he not been able to cannibalise fellow Ford Motor Company driver Eric Jackson's car for parts. After repairs were effected, he suffered what should have been a terminal rear differential failure. Encountering a Cortina by the roadside, he persuaded the initially reluctant owner to sell his rear axle and resumed once more, although at the cost of 80 minutes' delay while it was replaced.

This left Lucien Bianchi and co-driver Jean-Claude Ogier in the Citroën DS in the lead ahead of Gilbert Staepelaere/Simo Lampinen in the German Ford Taunus, with Andrew Cowan in the Hillman Hunter 3rd. Then Staepelaere's Taunus hit a gate post, breaking a track rod. This left Cowan in second position and Paddy Hopkirk's Austin 1800 in third place. Approaching the Nowra checkpoint at the end of the penultimate stage with only  to Sydney, the Frenchmen were involved in a head-on collision with a motorist who mistakenly entered a closed course, wrecking their Citroën DS and hospitalising the pair.

Hopkirk, the first driver on the scene (ahead of Cowan on the road, but behind on penalties) stopped to tend to the injured and extinguish the flames in the burning cars. Andrew Cowan, next on the scene, also slowed but was waved through with the message that everything was under control. Hopkirk rejoined the rally, and neither he nor Cowan lost penalties in this stage. So Andrew Cowan, who had requested "a car to come last" from the Chrysler factory on the assumption that only half a dozen drivers would even reach Sydney, took victory in his Hillman Hunter and claimed the £10,000 prize. Hopkirk finished second, while Australian Ian Vaughan was third in a factory-entered Ford XT Falcon GT. Ford Australia won the Teams' Prize with their three Falcons GTs, placing 3rd, 6th and 8th.

1977

The success of the 1968 marathon spawned the World Cup rallies, although after the controversial 1974 event, no further World Cup event would be held.  While the original event was to prove a triumph for the Rootes Group, the 1977 edition, this time sponsored by Singapore Airlines, was dominated by Mercedes-Benz. The German marque claimed a 1–2 finish and had two other cars in the top eight, with Andrew Cowan in a 280E repeating his success of nine years previous, followed home by teammate Tony Fowkes in a similar car. Paddy Hopkirk, this time driving a Citroën CX, took the final podium spot.

1993

Nick Brittan, a competitor in the original event in a Lotus Cortina, established his company as an organiser of modern endurance rallies with a 25th anniversary re-run of the marathon in 1993. He persuaded 21 drivers who had competed in 1968 to return, including Andrew Cowan and Roger Clark, and altogether 106 teams from 17 countries entered. Cowan drove the same car as the first time, having his Hillman Hunter loaned to him by the Scottish Automobile Club museum, while other competitors drove pre-1970 era cars. The entry fee was £12,900, and the estimated cost of participating was put at £45,000.

The 16,000 km rally had three major differences to its ancestor. First, the changing political climate in the Middle East meant that several countries such as Iran and Afghanistan were now out of bounds, although in Europe, Turkey and Australia much of the original route was retraced. Also, the old scheduled open road sections were replaced with more modern timed special stages for safety reasons. Finally, with the demise of the great passenger liners there would be no great voyage across the Indian Ocean to Australia, Brittan instead negotiating for two Antonov An-124 cargo planes to take the vehicles to Australia.

The winning driver was Francis Tuthill in a Porsche 911, ahead of the Ford Falcon GT of Ian Vaughan who finished third in 1968. Kenya's Mike Kirkland, a stalwart of the Safari Rally, took the final place on the podium in a Peugeot 504.

2000

A second rerun was organised in 2000 as a "Millennium celebration of [the] first epic event." Again, much of Asia was inaccessible for political reasons, with two airlifts instead of the single one of 1993. Now, after crossing Europe and Turkey in the first fourteen days, the competitors would be loaded on to the Antonovs for the trip to northern Thailand, driving south through the country and into Malaysia for twelve days before being flown to Australia for the last eight days of the rally.

Of the 100 starters who left London 78 reached Sydney, with Stig Blomqvist and Ben Rainsford scoring victory ahead of Michèle Mouton in a Porsche 911, whose co-driver was 1993 winner Francis Tuthill. Rick Bates and Jenny Brittan in another 911 took third.

2004

The third re-run was a combination of modern Group N (showroom-class) cars, and pre-1977 classics, all limited to two wheel drive and a sub-two-litre engine. New Zealand, in tandem with Lincolnshire, England race-preparation specialists Langworth Motorsport, scored a 1–2–3 podium clean sweep with three Kiwi-piloted Honda Integras; overall winners Joe McAndrew and Murray Cole, runners-up Mike Montgomery and Roy Wilson, and Shane Murland and John Benton in third. The highest-placed classic car was a Ford Escort RS1600 driven by Britain's Anthony Ward and Mark Solloway, which finished sixth overall.

2014
Ten years later a sixth Marathon was run. Differing from its five predecessors it was run in the reverse direction, starting in Sydney and travelling to London with an airlift linking the west coast of Australia to Turkey.

Winners by year

References

Notes

Bibliography

External links

The 1968 Daily Express London to Sydney Marathon: The great adventure of the decade, Julian Marsh, 1996
Trans World Events, organisers of the third, fourth and fifth rallies
1993 • 2000 • 2004
Australian government website promoting the 2004 event
"Marathon men – get ready for London-Sydney 2004", Peter McKay, Drive.com.au, 6 January 2003
Volvo UK Club coverage of the 1993 event
Day-by-day coverage of the 2004 event at Langworth Motorsport
Ford Works Lotus Cortina 1968 entry description

Rally raid races
Motorcycle races
Auto races in Australia
Motorsport competitions in Australia
Motorsport competitions in the United Kingdom
Sport in London
Sport in Sydney